El Salvador is a municipality in the Mexican state of Zacatecas, located approximately  northeast of Zacatecas City, the state capital.

Geography
It borders the municipalities of Concepción del Oro in Zacatecas to the west, Saltillo in Coahuila to the north, Galeana in Nuevo León to the northeast, and Vanegas in San Luis Potosí to the southeast.

The land cover in El Salvador is mostly Meseta Central matorral (81%) with small tracts of forest (11%) and grassland (8%) also present. The municipality is situated in the Matehuala sub-basin of the Llanos el Salado.

El Salvador's climate ranges from semiarid to arid desert.

History
Cave paintings in the municipality demonstrate past occupation of the area by  tribes. Colonial settlement of the area dates to the 18th century, when it was part of the Hacienda El Salado. Based in the neighbouring state of San Luis Potosí, this was one of the largest haciendas in Mexico, and was owned by Juan Bustamante, a former governor of that state. , who was born in El Salvador in 1891, served as Governor of Zacatecas from 1932 to 1936, and as Secretary of National Defence from 1952 to 1958.

The congregacíon of El Salvador was established in the municipality of Concepción del Oro on 14 November 1964. It became an independent municipality a week later on 21 November 1964.

Administration
The municipal government of El Salvador comprises a president, a councillor (Spanish: síndico), and seven trustees (regidores), four elected by relative majority and three by proportional representation. The current president of the municipality is Miguel Coronado Gómez.

Demographics
In the 2020 Mexican Census, the municipality of El Salvador recorded a population of 2509 inhabitants living in 733 households. The 2010 Census recorded a population of 2710 inhabitants in El Salvador.

There are 24 inhabited localities in the municipality, of which only the municipal seat, also called El Salvador, is classified as urban. It recorded a population of 982 inhabitants in the 2020 Census.

Economy and infrastructure
In the 2015 Intercensal Survey, 53% of El Salvador's workforce was employed in the primary sector, 16% in the secondary sector, 6% in commerce, and 24% in services. Agricultural activities in the municipality include cattle and goat farming.

The Kansas City Southern de México railway runs north to south through the municipality.

References

Municipalities of Zacatecas
1964 establishments in Mexico
States and territories established in 1964